Poland competed at the 1934 European Athletics Championships in Turin, Italy, from 7-9 September 1934. A delegation of 5 athletes were sent to represent the country.

Medals

References

European Athletics Championships
1934
Nations at the 1934 European Athletics Championships